Nairu Pidicha Pulivalu is a 1958 Malayalam film directed by P. Bhaskaran and written by Uroob based on his own story "Business". Ragini and Sathyan play the lead roles, while Prema, Pankajavalli and T.S. Muthayya appear in major supporting roles. The film received a certificate of merit at the National Film Awards.

Plot
The film is set against the backdrop of a circus company. Chandran is a circus performer. Thankam, a beautiful 17-year-old girl, is his childhood sweetheart. But, Thankam's mother Kalyani Amma forbids her to prolong her affair with Chandran. She wants Thankam to marry Gopi, a well known bully from the town. Thankam's father Paithal Nair, however rejects this proposal. But as the circus shifts to another village, everything goes wrong. The circus people owed some money to Paithal Nair which they were unable to pay. Despite the circus manager's assurances Kalyani Amma and Nair decide to hold the circus animals hostage until the circus manager repays his debt.  Managing the animals soon becomes a nightmare and Paithal and family realize they have invited trouble (pulival pidikkuka - an expression in Malayalam for trouble, mess etc. It literally means catch a leopard by its tail). Paithal Nair is in financial stress and has no other way than to accept the marriage proposal from Gopi for his daughter. Chandran decides to make enough money by playing trapeze without a safety net. But Lalitha, whose proposal is rejected by Chandran, damage the rope of trapeze to kill Chandran. But Chandran fall to ground only with minor injuries and Lalitha commits suicide. Gopi is attacked and killed by an unleashed tiger, just before the marriage. Chandran arrives to the spot and kills the tiger though Gopi eventually dies from the injuries. At the end of the movie, Chandran marries Thankam.

Cast
 Ragini as Thankam
 Sathyan as Chandran
 Prema Menon as Lalitha, a circus performer who also loves Chandran
 Pankajavalli as Kalyani Amma
 T. S. Muthaiah as Paithal Nair
 Muthukulam Raghavan Pillai as Kuttappa Kurup
 S. P. Pillai as Chanthu, a circus joker
 Bahadoor as Keshu, a circus joker
 G. K. Pillai as Gopi
 T. N. Gopinathan Nair as Circus Proprietor
 Kochappan as Kirukkan Kochunni
 Kunhava as Khader
 Vaanakkutty as Kurup's Guru
TKR Bhadran

Soundtrack
The music was composed by K. Raghavan with lyrics by P. Bhaskaran.

References

External links
 
 Nairu Pidicha Pulivalu at the Malayalam Movie Database

1950s Malayalam-language films
Films based on short fiction
Circus films
Films scored by K. V. Mahadevan
Films directed by P. Bhaskaran